Burning Gold is a 1927 American silent drama film directed by John W. Noble and starring Herbert Rawlinson, Shirley Palmer and Sheldon Lewis.

Cast
 Herbert Rawlinson as Bob Roberts  
 Shirley Palmer as Nan Preston  
 Sheldon Lewis as James Clark  
 Nils Keith as Preston  
 Mildred Harris as Claire Owens
 J.C. Fowler

References

Bibliography
 Palmer, Scott. British Film Actors' Credits, 1895-1987. McFarland, 1988.

External links
 

1927 films
1927 drama films
1920s English-language films
American silent feature films
Silent American drama films
Films directed by John W. Noble
American black-and-white films
1920s American films